Guillaum François "Frank" Zweerts (born 29 June 1943) is a retired field hockey player from the Netherlands. He competed  at 1964 Summer Olympics, where his team finished in seventh place. With eight goals in six games, Zweerts was the best Dutch player and one of the best overall scorers at those games.

His younger brother Jeroen competed in field hockey at the 1972 Summer Olympics.

References

External links
 

1943 births
Living people
Dutch male field hockey players
Field hockey players at the 1964 Summer Olympics
Olympic field hockey players of the Netherlands
Sportspeople from Hilversum